The name Phyliss may refer to:

Phyllis Latour
Phyliss Kernick
Phyliss J. Anderson